Hakob Gyurjian (Gurdjian) (1881 – December 28, 1948) was an Armenian sculptor.

Biography 

Gyurjian was born in Shushi, and studied at Académie Julian in Paris and at Auguste Rodin's studio. In 1914-1921 he worked in Moscow (Vladimir Lenin participated during the opening of a monument by Gyurjian). From 1921 he lived in Paris.

Famous works
He is the author of over 300 sculpture portraits (Feodor Chaliapin, Sergei Rachmaninoff, Ludwig van Beethoven, Vahan Terian, Martiros Saryan, Georgy Yakulov,  etc.), also “Diana”, “Nude woman”, “Adolescence” and many others are famous sculptures. National Gallery of Armenia has a big collection of Gyurjian's works.  He died in Paris, aged 67.

Bibliography
Gautier М., A. Gurdjan, P., 1954.

References

1881 births
1948 deaths
Artists from Shusha
20th-century Armenian sculptors